Paul Bellón Saracho (born 4 June 1997) is a Mexican professional footballer who plays as a centre-back for Liga MX club León, on loan from UdeG.

Career statistics

Club

References

External links

 
 

Living people
1997 births
Association football defenders
Ascenso MX players
Club León footballers
Leones Negros UdeG footballers
Liga de Expansión MX players
Liga MX players
Footballers from Jalisco
People from Guadalajara, Jalisco
Mexican footballers